Tamar Schlick is an American applied mathematician who works as a professor of chemistry, mathematics, and computer science at New York University. Her research involves developing and applying tools for modeling and simulating biomolecules.

Education and career
Schlick did her undergraduate studies at Wayne State University, graduating in 1982 with a B.S. in mathematics. She continued her graduate studies at the Courant Institute of Mathematical Sciences at New York University, completing a Ph.D. in applied mathematics in 1987 under the supervision of Charles S. Peskin.

After postdoctoral studies at NYU and the Weizmann Institute of Science, she returned as a faculty member to NYU in 1989.

Recognition
She is a fellow of the American Association for the Advancement of Science (2004), American Physical Society (2005), Biophysical Society (2012), and Society for Industrial and Applied Mathematics (2012).

References

External links
Home page

Year of birth missing (living people)
Living people
20th-century American mathematicians
21st-century American mathematicians
21st-century American chemists
American computer scientists
American women chemists
American women mathematicians
American women computer scientists
Wayne State University alumni
Courant Institute of Mathematical Sciences alumni
New York University faculty
Fellows of the American Association for the Advancement of Science
Fellows of the American Physical Society
Fellows of the Society for Industrial and Applied Mathematics
20th-century women mathematicians
21st-century women mathematicians
20th-century American women
21st-century American women